Marienborg Manor is an estate on the Danish island of Møn. The estate has a large park with public access. The main building was demolished in 1984. The estate, covering , contains the thatched tenant farm of Egeløkke. Manorial records exist from 1769, though earlier records may exist in the Møn Cavalry District records.

History

Nygaard
In 1668, Frederik III gave Captain Jacob Nielsen several estates on Møn, including the Nygård farm, as a reward for his having captured a Swedish ship and brought it back to Copenhagen with its cargo and Danish prisoners of war. Nielsen apparently only kept it for a short period. Later, a manor was built there as the residence of Samuel Christoph von Plessen, who in 1685 was appointed governor of Møn. Plessen used bricks from Stege's town wall for the building. When he was relieved of his position of governor in 1697, the house was totally or partially demolished. Casper Gottlob Moltke, who was governor from 1703 to 1728, tidied up the estate and built a new manor house in 1707. In 1739-47, Count Adam Gottlob Moltke resided on the estate but handed it over to the new governor, Frederik Christian von Møsting,  against a payment of 6,000 rigsdaler for the building. In 1769, von Møsting transferred the estate to the Crown in return for compensation for the building.

Marienborg, 17691888
When the Crown sold the property in 1769, it was bought by local farmers but as they were unable to afford the full payment,  Regimental Quartermaster Esaias Fleischer from Næstved, together with Magnus Bering Beringskjold, bought it instead. Shortly afterwards, Beringskjold took the property over himself, naming it Marienborg after his wife Marie Kirstine von Cappelen. Being unable to make a payment, in 1776, Beringskjold sold the estate in turn to Charles François de Bosc de la Calmette, whose son Antoine de Bosc de la Calmette, remembered for the romantic English landscape garden he laid out at Liselund on Møn, took it over after the father's death in 1781, calling the manor Calmettenborg. 
On Antoine's death in 1781, his son Charles Bosc de la Calmette inherited the estate, and on his death it was sold in 1821 to the master of the royal hunt, Peter Adolph Tutein, who also bought Kostervig. In 1853-1855, he built a new building with a tower in the style of an Italian palace to a design by architect Vilhelm Theodor Walther;

Moltke family, 1888present
in 1888, the estate was bought by Hemming Moltke, who in 1893 demolished the old main building from Casper Moltke's time and built instead a new building with a tower designed by architect Axel Berg. A fire destroyed several of the estates buildings in 1908. Moltke's widow Clara Moltke left the estate in 1948 to her grandson P. C. F. G. Moltke.

Marienborg today
Marienborg now consists of a farming and forestry estate in West Møn, specializing in pig rearing. Of a total of 1,392 ha, 370 ha are forest. The estate consists of Marienborg, Egelykke, Frøhave, Skovridergaarden and Lille Lind. It covers countryside which includes woods, pastures, fields and hedgerows. To the southeast, it reaches the Baltic coast.

Owners
1668: Crown
1668 - 1673: Jacob Nielsen Danefer
1673 - 1685: Crown
1685 - 1697: Samuel Christoph von Plessen
1697 - 1703: Crown
1703 - 1728: Casper Gottlob Moltke
1728 - 1739: Crown
1739 - 1747: Adam Gottlob Moltke
1749 - 1769: Frederik Christian von Møsting
1769: Crown
1769 - 1772: Esaias Fleischer / Magnus Beringschjold
1772 - 1777: Magnus Beringschjold
1777 - 1781: Charles François de Bosc de la Calmette
1781 - 1803: Antoine de Bosc de la Calmette
1803 - 1820: Charles de Bosc de la Calmette
1820 - 1821: Estate of Charles de Bosc de la Calmette
1821 - 1885: Peter Adolph Tutein
1885 - 1888: Estate of Peter Adolph Tutein
1888 - 1927: Hemming Moltke
1927 - 1948: Clara Schnack, Hemming Moltke's widow
1948 - 1984: Peter Christian Frederik Gustav, Count Moltke
1984–present: Birgitte Anna Caroline Hansdatter, Countess Moltke

References

Møn
Manor houses in Vordingborg Municipality
Houses completed in 1707
1707 establishments in Denmark
Buildings and structures in Denmark associated with the Moltke family
Demolished buildings and structures in Denmark
Buildings and structures demolished in 1984